Reinhard Münster (born 1955) is a German film director and screenwriter. His 1994 film Back to Square One was entered into the 44th Berlin International Film Festival.

Selected filmography
 Dorado – One Way (1984)
  (1990)
 Back to Square One (1994)

References

External links

1955 births
Living people
Mass media people from North Rhine-Westphalia